Limetz-Villez is a commune in the Yvelines department in the Île-de-France region in north-central France.

See also
Communes of the Yvelines department

References

Communes of Yvelines